Charles Paumier du Vergier was a Belgian sport shooter who competed in the early 20th century in rifle shooting. He participated in Shooting at the 1900 Summer Olympics in Paris and won a bronze medal in the military rifle standing event. He also competed at the 1908 Summer Olympics, winning a silver medal in the team 50 yard free pistol event.

References

External links
 

Year of birth missing
Year of death missing
Belgian male sport shooters
ISSF rifle shooters
Olympic bronze medalists for Belgium
Olympic silver medalists for Belgium
Olympic shooters of Belgium
Shooters at the 1900 Summer Olympics
Shooters at the 1908 Summer Olympics
Place of birth missing
Olympic medalists in shooting
Medalists at the 1900 Summer Olympics
Medalists at the 1908 Summer Olympics
Place of death missing